María Victoria Besonías (born 8 October 1947, Madrid) is a Spanish-born Argentinian architect employed at the University of Buenos Aires as a professor of architecture. She has won numerous architectural awards, in 2012 receiving the Trajectory and Merit Award from the Argentine Senate.

Early career
In 1965, Besonías began her undergraduate studies at the Faculty of Architecture and Urbanisnm at the University of Buenos Aires and graduated in 1975. She is faculty at FADU, the University of Buenos Aires, and a member of the jury’s panel of FADEA.

Works
From 1975, she formed a partnership with her husband Guillermo de Almeida. From 1976 until 1997, they worked in tandem with Julián Sirolli, and as head of the BAK studio together with Luciano Kruk from 2000 until 2012, when it was integrated into the Besonias Almeida studio.

Citations

References
Online

External links
 
 

1947 births
Living people
Argentine women architects
People from Madrid
Architects from Buenos Aires
Spanish emigrants to Argentina
Academic staff of the University of Buenos Aires